L.A. Law is an American legal drama television series that ran for eight seasons on NBC, from September 15, 1986, to May 19, 1994.

Created by Steven Bochco and Terry Louise Fisher, it centers on the partners, associates and staff of a Los Angeles law firm. The show contains many of Bochco's trademark features, including an ensemble cast, large number of parallel storylines, social drama, and off-the-wall humor. It reflects the social and cultural ideologies that were occurring when the show was produced in the 1980s and early 1990s, and many of the cases featured on the show dealt with hot-button issues such as capital punishment, abortion, racism, homophobia, sexual harassment, HIV/AIDS, and domestic violence. The series often also reflects social tensions between the wealthy senior lawyer protagonists and their less well–paid junior staff.

In addition to its main cast, L.A. Law was also well known for featuring then–relatively unknown actors and actresses in guest starring roles, who later went on to greater success in film and television including Don Cheadle, Jeffrey Tambor, Kathy Bates, David Schwimmer, Jay O. Sanders, James Avery, Gates McFadden, Bryan Cranston, CCH Pounder, Kevin Spacey, Richard Schiff, Carrie-Anne Moss, William H. Macy, Stephen Root, Christian Slater, Steve Buscemi, and Lucy Liu. Several episodes of the show also included celebrities such as Vanna White, Buddy Hackett, and Mamie Van Doren appearing as themselves in cameo roles.

The show was popular with audiences and critics, ranking in Nielsen Top 30 for its first 6 seasons and winning 15 Emmy Awards throughout its run, four of which were for Primetime Emmy Award for Outstanding Drama Series.

Synopsis
The series is set in and around the fictional Los Angeles–based law firm McKenzie, Brackman, Chaney and Kuzak (later McKenzie, Brackman, Chaney, Kuzak, and Becker) and featured attorneys at the firm and various members of the support staff. The exteriors for the law firm were shot at the FourFortyFour South Flower building in downtown Los Angeles, which was known as the 444 Flower Building at the time. The opening credits sequence of every episode began with a close-up of a car trunk being slammed shut revealing a personalized license plate reading "LA LAW". For the first seven seasons, the model car used was a Jaguar XJ Series III; for the 8th and final season, the Jaguar was replaced with a 1993 Bentley Continental R. Both cars carried registration stickers indicating the year in which each season began. Two different musical openings for the show's theme were used: a saxophone riff  for episodes that were lighter in tone; and an ominous synthesizer chord, for more serious storylines.

Cast and characters

Cast timeline

Cast notes

Main characters
 Harry Hamlin as Michael Kuzak, partner (1986–91; seasons 1–5, reunion)
 Corbin Bernsen as Arnold "Arnie" Becker, partner (1986–94; seasons 1–8, reunion)
 Jill Eikenberry as Ann Kelsey, associate, partner (1986–94; seasons 1–8, reunion)
 Alan Rachins as Douglas Brackman, Jr., managing partner, interim senior partner (1986–94; seasons 1–8, reunion)
 Michele Greene as Abby Perkins, associate (1986–91; seasons 1–5, reunion)
 Jimmy Smits as Victor Sifuentes, associate (1986–91, 1992; seasons 1–5, guest season 6)
 Michael Tucker as Stuart Markowitz, associate, partner (1986–94; seasons 1–8, reunion)
 Susan Ruttan as Roxanne Melman, secretary, office administrator (1986–93; seasons 1–7, reunion, guest season 8)
 Richard Dysart as Leland McKenzie, senior partner (1986–94; seasons 1–8, reunion)
 Susan Dey as Grace van Owen, deputy district attorney, superior court judge, partner (1986–92; seasons 1–6, reunion)
 Blair Underwood as Jonathan Rollins, associate, partner (1987–94; seasons 2–8)
 Larry Drake as Benny Stulwicz (1987–94; seasons 3–8, reunion, guest season 1, recurring season 2)
 Amanda Donohoe as Cara Jean "C.J." Lamb, associate (1990–92; seasons 5–6)
 John Spencer as Tommy Mullaney, associate, assistant district attorney (1990–94; seasons 5–8)
 Cecil Hoffman as Zoey Clemmons, assistant district attorney (1991–92; seasons 5–7)
 Sheila Kelley as Gwen Taylor, secretary, law intern (1990–93; seasons 6–7, guest season 4, recurring season 5)
 Michael Cumpsty as Frank Kittredge, tenant (1991–92; season 6)
 Conchata Ferrell as Susan Bloom, tenant (1991–92; season 6)
 A Martinez as Daniel Morales, partner (1992–94; seasons 7–8)
 Lisa Zane as Melina Paros, associate (1992–93; season 7)
 Alan Rosenberg as Eli Levinson, partner (1993–94; season 8, reunion)
 Debi Mazar as Denise Iannello, secretary (1993–94; season 8)
 Alexandra Powers as Jane Halliday, associate (1993–94; season 8)

Recurring characters
 Patricia Huston as Hilda Brunschwager, Brackman's secretary (1986–88; seasons 1 & 2; recurring)
 Bernie Hern as Judge Sidney Schroeder (1986–87; seasons 1 & 2; 1991; season 5; recurring)
 John Hancock as Judge Richard Armand (1986–87; season 1; 1989–1991; seasons 4–6; recurring)
 Anne Haney as Judge Marilyn Travelini (1986–94; seasons 1–8; recurring)
 Cynthia Harris as Iris Hubbard, McKenzie's secretary and law intern (1986–87; season 1; recurring)
 George Coe as Judge Wallace R. Vance (1986–91; seasons 1–6; recurring)
 Jerry Hardin as D.A. Malcolm Gold (1986–92; seasons 1–6; recurring)
 Carmen Argenziano as Neil Robertson, a lawyer (1986–92; seasons 1–6; recurring)
 Michael Fairman as Judge Douglas McGrath (1986–94; seasons 1–8; recurring)
 Bruce Kirby as D.A. Bruce Rogoff (1986–91; seasons 1–5; recurring)
 Michael Holden as D.A. George Handeman (1987; 1992; seasons 1 & 6; recurring)
 Joanna Frank as Sheila Brackman, Douglas Brackman's wife (1987–88; seasons 1–3; 1992–94; seasons 6–8; recurring)
 Annie Abbott as Judge Janice L. Neiman (1987–94; seasons 2–8; recurring)
 Diane Delano as Rhonda Vasek (1987; season 2; recurring)
 Ellen Blake as Elizabeth Brand, Kuzak's secretary (1987–90; seasons 2–4; recurring)
 Jeff Silverman as Erroll Farrell (1987–88; season 2; recurring)
 Daniel Benzali as Judge Donald Phillips (1988; 1991–1993; season 2; seasons 5–7; recurring)
 Paul Regina as Felix Echeverria, a lawyer (1988–92; seasons 2–6; recurring)
 Don Sparks as Russell Spitzer, a lawyer (1988–93; seasons 2–7; recurring)
 Earl Boen as Judge Walter L. Swanson (1988–93; seasons 2–8; recurring)
 Leonard Stone as Judge Paul Hansen (1988; 1991–94; season 2; seasons 5–8; recurring)
 James Avery as Judge Michael Conover (1988–92; seasons 2–6 recurring)
 Raye Birk as Judge Steven Lang (1988–93; seasons 2–7; recurring)
 Dann Florek as Dave Meyer, a direct-mail businessman and Roxanne's husband (1988–93; seasons 2–8; recurring plus reunion film)
 Wayne Northrop as Bill Ringstrom (1988–89; season 3; recurring)
 Nancy Vawter as Dorothy Wyler, an associate (1988–89; season 3; recurring)
 Gerald Anthony as Ross Burnett (1988–89; season 3; recurring)
 Joyce Hyser as Allison Gottlieb, a filmmaker and Sifuentes' girlfriend (1989–90; seasons 3 & 4; recurring)
 Stan Kamber as Judge Harlan Shubow (1989–91; seasons 3–6; recurring)
 Renée Jones as Diana Moses, a law intern and Rollins' girlfriend (1989–90; seasons 3–5; recurring)
 Bruce Fairbairn as Sheldon Ganz, a lawyer (1989–92; seasons 3–7; recurring)
 Amanda Plummer as Alice Hackett, Benny Stulwicz' girlfriend (1989–90; seasons 3 & 4; recurring)
 Wayne Tippit as Leo Hackett, Alice's father (1989–90; seasons 3 & 4; recurring)
 Keith Mills as Judge Walter Green (1989–93; seasons 3–8; recurring)
 Jennifer Hetrick as Corrinne Hammond, Becker's wife (1989–91; seasons 4 & 5; recurring)
 Carl Lumbly as Dr. Earl Williams, a murder trial suspect and Kuzak's client (1989–90; season 4; recurring)
 Lorinne Vozoff as Judge Roberta Harbin (1989–92; seasons 4 & 6; recurring)
 Vonetta McGee as Jackie Williams, Earl's wife (1989–90; season 4; recurring)
 Veronica Cartwright as Margaret Flanagan, the assistant district attorney who prosecutes Earl Williams (1989–92; seasons 4 & 6; recurring)
 Diana Muldaur as Rosalind Shays, a ruthless, greedy and manipulative partner and the series' main antagonist (1989–91; seasons 4 & 5; recurring)
 Lillian Lehman as Judge Mary Harcourt (1989–94; seasons 4–8; recurring)
 Courtney Thorne-Smith as Kimberly Dugan, a cheerleader whom Kuzak dates (1990; season 4; recurring)
 Lawrence Dobkin as U.S. District Judge Saul Edelstein (1990–94; seasons 4–8; recurring)
 Jordan Baker as ADA Marcia Fusco (1990; seasons 4 & 5; recurring)
 Concetta Tomei as Susan Hauber, a lawyer (1990–93; seasons 4–8; recurring)
 Vincent Gardenia as Murray Melman, Roxanne's estranged father (1990; seasons 4 & 5; recurring)
 Stanley Grover as Judge Richard Lobel (1990–94; seasons 4–8; recurring)
 Denis Arndt as Jack Sollers, a lawyer (1990–91; season 5; recurring)
 Tom Verica as Billy Castroverti, an associate (1991; seasons 5 & 6; recurring)
 Brad Sherwood as Ned Barron (1991–92; season 6; recurring)
 Lauren Lane as Julie Rayburn (1991–92; season 6; recurring)
 Lynne Thigpen as D.A. Ruby Thomas (1991–92; seasons 6 & 7 recurring)
 Anthony DeSando as Alex DePalma, an associate (1992; season 6; recurring)
 Alison Tucker as Sarah Alder, Stuart Markowitz's illegitimate daughter (1992; season 6; recurring)
 David Schwimmer as Dana Romney, a troublesome city attorney and minor antagonist (1992–93; season 7; recurring)
 Shelley Berman as Ben Flicker, a film studio mogul whom Becker does business with (1992–93; season 7; recurring)
 Anne Twomey as Linda Salerno, Gwen's homicidal stalker (1993; season 7; recurring)
 Joe Grifasi as Dominic Nuzzi, a gambler friend of Benny's (1993–94; seasons 7 & 8; recurring)
 Kathleen Wilhoite as Rosalie Hendrickson Stulwicz, a woman whom Benny dates and later marries (1993–94; seasons 7 & 8; recurring)
 Steven Eckholdt as Patrick Flanagan, a charismatic, but unethical and manipulative associate and a minor antagonist for the final episodes (1994; season 8; recurring)

Series history

L.A. Law'''s two-hour pilot movie aired on Monday, September15, 1986. An encore aired in place of Saturday Night Live on September27, 1986, being a rare scripted rerun in that late-night slot.

The original time period was Friday, 10:00p.m., following Miami Vice, but after struggling there, it assumed NBC's prized Thursday, 10:00p.m. (9:00p.m. Central) time slot in the Must See TV primetime block from another Bochco-produced show, Hill Street Blues (from which Bochco had been dismissed at the end of that show's fifth season by then-MTM President Arthur Price). The show was itself eventually replaced by another hit ensemble drama, ER.

Co-creator Terry Louise Fisher was fired from the series in season 2 and filed a well-publicized lawsuit with Bochco and the studio. Bochco and Fisher had also co-created the 1987 John Ritter series Hooperman for ABC.

The scene in season 5 where Leland McKenzie (Richard Dysart) was shown in bed with his enemy Rosalind Shays (Diana Muldaur) was ranked as the 38th greatest moment in television (the list originally appeared in an issue of EGG Magazine). The episode "Good To The Last Drop" in which Rosalind met her demise—falling into an open elevator shaft—was ranked No.91 on TV Guide's 100 Greatest Episodes of All Time. It was referenced in The Star Trek Encyclopedia (prior to L.A. Law, Muldaur had played Dr. Katherine Pulaski during season 2 of Star Trek: The Next Generation) in which Pulaski's biography says: "There is no truth to the rumor that an ancestor of Dr. Pulaski was killed falling down the elevator shaft at a prestigious Los Angeles law firm."After co-writing the feature film, From the Hip, Boston attorney David E. Kelley was hired by Bochco during the first season of L.A. Law. Kelley went on to critical and commercial success as show-runner of the series before leaving to create Picket Fences. While on L.A. Law, Kelley and Bochco co-created Doogie Howser, M.D. as the first Steven Bochco Productions series for a major, ten-series deal with ABC. Shortly thereafter, Bochco was offered the job as President of ABC Entertainment, but he turned it down.

At the height of the show's popularity in the late-1980s, attention was focused upon a fictitious sex position named the "Venus Butterfly" in season 1. The only clue describing the technique was a vague reference to "ordering room service". Fans and interested persons flooded the show's producers with letters asking for more details about this mysterious technique.

The show won GLAAD’s first Media Award for Outstanding Drama Series in 1990, which it shared with Heartbeat. The first lesbian kiss on television occurred on the show in 1991 ("He's a Crowd", Season5, Episode12), between the characters of C.J. Lamb (played by Amanda Donohoe) and Abby (Michele Greene).

The show tied itself into the events of the Los Angeles riots of 1992, which were prompted by the acquittal of four white police officers who were put on trial for the videotaped beating of black motorist Rodney King.  In a scene reminiscent of the Attack on Reginald Denny, tax attorney Stuart Markowitz is struck on the head by a rioter, and ends up having serious head injuries, causing a number of problems for him and his wife for several episodes as a result. Partner Douglas Brackman is also arrested in the mayhem of the riots as he is on his way to get remarried.

After the fifth season, Kelley left the show. Patricia Green and Rick Wallace were his replacements as executive producer. Green was the main creative force. Her character additions amid cast turnover were met with mixed reaction. She left the show in January 1992. Kelley and Bochco returned to write episodes and Bochco moved back to executive producer from consultant while Kelley stayed consultant. Bochco left the executive producer position after the sixth season and John Tinker and John Masius were brought in to run the seventh season. Kelley exited as consultant. Amid plummeting ratings during the seventh season, co-executive producers John Tinker & John Masius were fired midseason, and while the show went on hiatus, William M. Finkelstein was brought in to fix it. Tinker and Masius had brought a whimsical, soap-operatic tone to the series for which they had been known on St. Elsewhere. Dan Castellaneta (the voice of Homer Simpson) appeared in a Homer costume and hired the attorneys in the seventh-season premiere. That episode also reflected on the 1992 Los Angeles riots. Finkelstein reined in the series, returning to the serious legal cases that made the series famous.

In the eighth and final season, the characters of Eli Levinson (Alan Rosenberg) and Denise Iannello (Debi Mazar) were transplanted from the canceled Bochco legal series Civil Wars. Eli Levinson was revealed to be Stuart Markowitz's cousin. During the final season, the series went on hiatus in January 1994 to launch the second season of Homicide: Life on the Street. When that series succeeded wildly with a guest appearance by Robin Williams, it was expected that L.A. Law would conclude that May and Homicide: Life on the Street would succeed it on Thursdays in the fall. However, ER tested so well that Warner Bros. executives campaigned network president Warren Littlefield to give that series the prized Thursday slot.

The series ended in 1994 with NBC not renewing the show for a ninth season at the last minute; ending the show without a proper finale or wrapping up storylines. Bochco envisioned the show being repackaged into an occasional television film; a reunion show titled L.A. Law: The Movie would air in 2002 and featured most of the main cast from the series.

On August4, 2020, Hamlin, Dey, Smits, Bernsen, Rachins, Greene and Underwood reunited on the Stars in the House video podcast to raise money for The Actors Fund.  It was the first time Hamlin and Smits appeared together in 30 years.

Reruns were shown on Lifetime and later A&E during the 1990s and 2000s.

Reception

Because of its popularity, L.A. Law had great influence on how Americans viewed the law and lawyers. The New York Times described it as "television's most serious attempt to date to portray American law and the people who practice it ... L.A. Law, perhaps more than any other force, has come to shape public perceptions about lawyers and the legal system". Attorneys reported that the show had affected how they dressed and spoke to juries (and, possibly, how those juries decided cases), and clients came to expect that cases could be tried and decided within a week. The number of applicants to law school rose because of how it glamourised the profession (including, as one law school dean stated, "the infinite possibilities for sex"), professors used L.A. Law as a teaching aid to discuss with their students legal issues raised in episodes, and law journal articles analysed the meaning of its plotlines. The show reportedly taught future lawyers things law school did not, such as time management and how to negotiate, and an attorney stated that the show accurately depicted life at a small law firm.

One law professor wrote in the Yale Law Journal that L.A. Law "has conveyed more 'bytes' of information (truthful or not), more images about lawyers, than all the Legal Studies programs, all the op-ed pieces, all the PBS shows put together." The show was "a massive distortion of reality ... the lawyers of L.A. Law are caricatures", he stated, but "caricatures are always caricatures of something, and that has to be real". Another wrote in the issue that the show "subtracts eighty to ninety-nine percent of lawyers' real work lives" and overemphasized the glamor of the rest. Unlike other works of legal fiction such as Perry Mason and Presumed Innocent, however, which are essentially mysteries that lawyers solve, L.A. Laws plots taught its tens of millions of viewers torts, ethics, and other basic legal ideas and dilemmas that comprise the first year of a legal education.

Home media
Revelation Films has released all eight seasons of LA Law on DVD in the UK (Region 2). This is the first time the show has been released on DVD anywhere in the world.

On April 18, 2016, Revelation Films released L.A. Law – The Complete Collection on DVD in the UK. The 46-disc box set features all 171 episodes of the series in special collectors packaging.

In Region 1, Shout! Factory has released the first three seasons on DVD.

 Cancelled sequel series  
In December 2020, it was reported that a sequel to the series was in development at ABC. Blair Underwood was set to reprise his role as Rollins and would also have served as executive producer. The sequel would have been produced by Steve Bochco Productions and 20th Television, with Bochco's widow Dayna and son Jesse co-executive producing. Marc Guggenheim and Ubah Mohamed were set to write and Anthony Hemingway direct. In October 2021, the series was given a pilot order. The same month, Corbin Bernsen joined the sequel series, reprising his role of Arnie Becker. In January 2022, Toks Olagundoye, Hari Nef and Ian Duff joined the cast. In February 2022, John Harlan Kim, Juliana Harkavy, and Kacey Rohl joined the cast. In May 2022, ABC announced that the sequel series would not be moving forward.

Accolades
The show won numerous awards, including 15 Emmy Awards. It won the Emmy for Outstanding Drama Series in 1987, 1989, 1990 and 1991. It was also nominated for the award in 1988 and 1992. Some of the actors, such as Larry Drake and Jimmy Smits, also received Emmys for their performances. The series shares the Emmy Award record for most acting nominations by regular cast members (excluding the guest performer category) for a single series in one year with Hill Street Blues, The West Wing and Game of Thrones''

For the 1988–1989 season, nine cast members were nominated for Emmys. Larry Drake, Jimmy Smits, and Richard Dysart were the only one to win (for Supporting Actor). The others nominated were: Michael Tucker (for Lead Actor); Jill Eikenberry and Susan Dey (both for Lead Actress); and Amanda Donohoe, Susan Ruttan, Michele Greene, and Conchata Ferrell (all for Supporting Actress).

The series won a Latino Image Award.

It was listed as number 42 on Entertainment Weekly's list of The New Classics in the July 4, 2008 issue.

Primetime Emmy Awards

Golden Globe Awards

References

External links

 
 
 Interview with Steven Bochco from the Academy of Television Arts & Sciences. Currently this video may not be available in some countries outside the U.S.

1986 American television series debuts
1994 American television series endings
1980s American legal television series
1980s American workplace drama television series
1990s American legal television series
1990s American workplace drama television series
American legal drama television series
Best Drama Series Golden Globe winners
English-language television shows
NBC original programming
Television franchises
American primetime television soap operas
Peabody Award-winning television programs
Primetime Emmy Award for Outstanding Drama Series winners
Primetime Emmy Award-winning television series
Television series by 20th Century Fox Television
Television series created by Steven Bochco
Television shows set in Los Angeles